Janjić is a surname. Notable people with the surname include:

Davor Janjić (born 1969), Bosnian actor
Dejan Janjić (born 1995), Serbian basketball player
Ilija Janjić (born 1944), Bosnian Croat Roman Catholic prelate
Nataša Janjić (born 1981), Croatian film, stage and television actress
Nikola Janjić (born 2002), Montenegrin footballer
Pero Janjić (born 1944), Bosnian Croat retired handball player and coach
Sava Janjić (born 1965), Serbian Orthodox archimandrite and a hegumen of the Visoki Dečani monastery
Slobodan Janjić (born 1987), Serbian futsal player
Zlatko Janjić (born 1986), Bosnian football player

See also
 Janić
 Janič

Bosnian surnames
Croatian surnames
Matronymic surnames